Makatsch is a surname. Notable people with the surname include:

Heike Makatsch (born 1971), German actress and singer
Rainer Makatsch (born 1946), German ice hockey player
Wolfgang Makatsch (1906–1983), German ornithologist and oologist